In music, Op. 54 stands for Opus number 54. Compositions that are assigned this number include:

 Beethoven – Piano Sonata No. 22
 Brahms – Schicksalslied
 Chopin – Scherzo No. 4
 Grieg – Lyric Suite
 Martin – Petite symphonie concertante
 Mendelssohn – Variations sérieuses
 Saint-Saëns – Requiem
 Schumann – Piano Concerto
 Scriabin – The Poem of Ecstasy
 Shostakovich – Symphony No. 6
 Sibelius – Swanwhite
 Strauss – Salome
 Tchaikovsky – Legend
 Vierne – Carillon de Westminster